RAR-related orphan receptor beta (ROR-beta), also known as NR1F2 (nuclear receptor subfamily 1, group F, member 2) is a nuclear receptor that in humans is encoded by the RORB gene.

Function 

The protein encoded by this gene is a member of the NR1 subfamily of nuclear hormone receptors. It is a DNA-binding protein that can bind as a monomer or as a homodimer to hormone response elements upstream of several genes to enhance the expression of those genes. The specific functions of this protein are not known, but it has been shown to interact with NM23-2, a nucleoside-diphosphate kinase involved in organogenesis and differentiation.

In the brain, ROR-beta is concentrated in layer 4 of the cerebral cortex, where it plays a role in the development of structures such as barrel columns.

A mutation in this gene also results in the loss of spinal cord interneurons and of saltatorial locomotion, a type of hopping gait that in mammals can be found in rabbits, hares, kangaroos, and some species of rodents.

Interactions 

RAR-related orphan receptor beta has been shown to interact with NME1.

See also 
 RAR-related orphan receptor

References

Further reading

External links 
 

Intracellular receptors
Transcription factors